Tabebuia pallida is a species of Tabebuia native to the Caribbean.

References

External links
 
 

pallida
Plants described in 1863
Trees of the Dominican Republic
Flora of the Dominican Republic
Flora without expected TNC conservation status